Battle of San Mateo may refer to:

 Battle of San Mateo (1814), a battle during the Venezuelan War of Independence
 Battle of San Mateo and Montalban, a battle on 1896 during the Philippine Revolution
 Battle of San Mateo (1899), a battle during the Philippine-American War
 Battle of San Matteo, a World War I battle

See also
 Battle of La Victoria (1812), also called the Battle of San Mateo